Acacia basedowii, commonly known as Basedow's wattle, is a shrub belonging to the genus Acacia and the subgenus Phyllodineae endemic to arid parts of central Australia.

Description
It blooms from June to October and produces yellow flowers. The shrub has slender, spinescent, pruinose branchlets. The majority of older phyllodes are shed giving it an open twiggy appearance. The simple and axillary inflorescences occur is pairs or solitary with spherical yellow flower-heads.

Taxonomy
The species was first formally described by the botanist Joseph Maiden in 1920 as part of the work Notes on Acacias, No. IV, with descriptions of new species. as published in the Journal and Proceedings of the Royal Society of New South Wales. It was reclassified as Racosperma basedowii by Leslie Pedley in 2003 and transferred back to the genus Acacia in 2006. The specific epithet honours the South Australian scientist and explorer Herbert Basedow who collected the type specimen from the Musgrave Ranges in 1903.

Distribution
It is native to an area in the central Goldfields region of Western Australia where it is found on stony slopes and along ephemeral watercourses a growing in firm red sandy soils. It is also found in the Mann-Musgrave block in north western South Australia and the south west of the Northern Territory.

See also
List of Acacia species

References

basedowii
Acacias of Western Australia
Plants described in 1920
Taxa named by Joseph Maiden
Flora of the Northern Territory
Flora of South Australia